João Victor Severino or simply João Victor (born 13 February 1984), is a Brazilian footballer who plays as a left back. As of August 2019, he plays for Remo.

Contract
São Caetano (Loan) 27 December 2007 to 30 November 2008
Cruzeiro 15 December 2007 to 19 April 2010

References

External links
 CBF
 zerozero.pt
 Guardian Stats Centre
 sambafoot

1984 births
Living people
Brazilian footballers
Cruzeiro Esporte Clube players
Associação Atlética Iguaçu players
Associação Desportiva Cabofriense players
Uberlândia Esporte Clube players
Paysandu Sport Club players
Associação Desportiva São Caetano players
Fortaleza Esporte Clube players
Criciúma Esporte Clube players
Ipatinga Futebol Clube players
Clube de Regatas Brasil players
Association football defenders